Ghanaian names (or personal names in Ghana) consist of several given names and surnames based on the language of ethnic groups in Ghana: including Akan, Mole-Dagombas, Ga, Ewe and Nzema. Frequently, children are given a "day name" which corresponds to the day in the week when they were born. These day names have further meanings concerning the soul and character of the person. Middle names have considerably more variety and can refer to their birth order, twin status, or an ancestor's middle name. These names are also used among Ghanaians living abroad and among Africans living in the diaspora who wish to identify with their ancestral homeland. During the 18th and 19th centuries, the enslaved people from modern day Ghana in the Caribbean were referred to as Coromantees. Most day names among the Mole-Dagombas are usually given to girls, and few are given to both sexes.

Most Ghanaians have at least one name from this system, even if they also have an Arabic or western name. Notable figures with day names include Ghana's first president Kwame Nkrumah and former United Nations Secretary General Kofi Annan.

Examples of Ghanaian day names (mainly in the southern part)

Examples of Ghanaian day names (mainly in the northern part)
(See Naming customs of the Dagomba people.)

References
 Johan Degen, 
Kropp Dakubu M.E. (2000). Personal Names of the Dagombas. p. 57. Michigan State University.

See also
Akan names

Ghanaian culture
Names by culture